A honeycomb mirror is a large mirror usually used as the primary mirror in astronomical reflecting telescopes whose face is supported by a ribbed structure that resembles a honeycomb. The design provides sufficient rigidity for ultra-high-precision optics while reducing the weight of the mirror. The reduced weight, in turn, allows smaller, lighter support and control structures, reducing the overall cost of the telescope. The term may also refer to mirrors made up of a coordinated set of individual hexagonal mirrors.

The development of the honeycomb mirror has allowed the creation of larger instruments than would be feasible with solid mirrors. Solid mirrors are not only mechanically cumbersome, but are also difficult to cast and safely cool into a single, large blocks of glass. Honeycomb designs can reduce the weight of the mirror by as much as 80%.

See also

 Liquid-mirror telescope
 List of largest optical reflecting telescopes
 List of telescope parts and construction

References

Optical telescope components
Mirrors